Litogyne is a monotypic genus of flowering plants belonging to the family Asteraceae. The only species is Litogyne gariepina.

Its native range is Tropical and Southern Africa.

References

Inuleae
Monotypic Asteraceae genera